Lin Chien-hsun (born 10 January 1993) is a Taiwanese footballer who currently plays as an attacking midfielder for the national and club level.

International goals

U19

U23

National team
Scores and results list Chinese Taipei's goal tally first.

References

1993 births
Living people
Taiwanese footballers
Chinese Taipei international footballers
Taiwan Power Company F.C. players
Association football midfielders
Footballers from Tainan